Norman Xiong (born November 9, 1998) is an American professional golfer.

Early life
Xiong was born in Guam to Chinese parents. He moved to San Diego, California when he was six with his mother, Jing, and uncle, James Xiong. He participated in the Pro Kids | First Tee Program in San Diego. His uncle served as his golf coach from an early age.

Amateur career
Xiong attended Temescal Canyon High School in Lake Elsinore, California. While in high school he won the Junior world championship, the Junior PGA Championship, was a first-team American Junior Golf Association All-American, and was the top junior golf prospect in California.

He left high school early to attend Oregon beginning in January 2017. In his first semester he won the Phil Mickelson Award as the nation's top freshman. Xiong won the Western Amateur in August by defeating Doc Redman, who would win the U.S. Amateur, after 22 holes.

At the 2017 U.S. Amateur, Xiong finished second in qualifying after shooting a round of 64, but was defeated in the opening round of match-play. He was selected for the American team at the 2017 Walker Cup, compiling a record of 3–0–1 as the Americans won the cup.

In 2018 he won the Jack Nicklaus Award as the Division I men's golfer of the year. He also received the Haskins Award as the most outstanding collegiate golfer.

Xiong's amateur success led his coach at Oregon, Casey Martin, to compare him to Tiger Woods at the same age.

Professional career

2018
Xiong announced he was turning professional in May 2018. He made his professional debut at U.S. Open sectional qualifying on June 4.

On December 9, Xiong finished second in Korn Ferry Tour qualifying to earn his card for 2019. He made just five cuts in 21 events in his rookie season and lost his KFT status after shooting 81 in the first round of Q-School.

In July 2021, Xiong was a Monday qualifier for the 3M Open, his first start on the PGA Tour in more than two years.

Amateur wins
2014 Sunriver Junior Open, Junior All-Star Invitational
2016 Thunderbird International Junior, Junior PGA Championship, Sunriver Junior Open
2017 Wyoming Desert Intercollegiate, Western Amateur, Rod Myers Invitational, Nike Collegiate Invite
2018 The Goodwin, Oregon Duck Invitational, Annual Western Intercollegiate, NCAA Pacific Regional

Source:

Professional wins (1)

Korn Ferry Tour wins (1)

U.S. national team appearances
Amateur
Junior Ryder Cup: 2016 (winners)
Palmer Cup: 2017 (winners)
Walker Cup: 2017 (winners)

References

External links
Oregon Ducks profile

American male golfers
Oregon Ducks men's golfers
Golfers from San Diego
Guamanian sportsmen
People from Canyon Lake, California
American sportspeople of Chinese descent
Guamanian people of Chinese descent
1998 births
Living people